Artistic gymnastics at the 2011 Canada Winter Games was held at the newly built Canada Games Centre in Halifax

The events were held during the first week between February 13 and 17, 2011.

Medal table
The following is the medal table for artistic gymnastics at the 2011 Canada Winter Games.

Men's Events

Women's Events

References

2011 Canada Winter Games
Canada Games artistic gymnastics
2011 Canada Games
2011 Canada Games
2011 Canada Winter Games